Wendy & Peter Pan is a play by Ella Hickson, adapted from the original play and novel Peter Pan; or, the Boy Who Wouldn't Grow Up  by J.M. Barrie. The play is a re-telling of the classic children's story which features Wendy Darling as the protagonist who flies away with Peter Pan to Neverland.

Background 
Playwright Ella Hickson was commissioned to write a new adaptation of Peter Pan for the Christmas show in Gregory Doran's first season as artistic director of the Royal Shakespeare Company.

This version of the classic children's story is told through Wendy Darling's perspective as she meets Peter Pan, the boy who never grows up. She and her brothers, John and Michael, fly away with Pan and Tink to Neverland where they meet with the Lost Boys and battle the evil Captain Hook. This feminist re-working of the story prominently discovers some of the darker themes within the original story and introduces some new characters, such as Tom, a fourth child of the Darling family.

Productions

RSC, Stratford-upon-Avon (2013-4) 

The play had its premiere on 10 December 2013 where it ran at the Royal Shakespeare Theatre in Stratford-Upon-Avon until 2 March 2014. The production was directed by Jonathan Munby, designed by Colin Richmond, music by Oliver Fox and Jason Carr, lighting by Oliver Fenwick, sound by Christopher Shutt and fights by Terry King.

RSC, Stratford-upon-Avon revival (2015-6) 
For Christmas 2015 the production was revived by the RSC at the Royal Shakespeare Theatre where it began on 25 November 2015, with previews from 17 November, and ran until 31 January 2016. The play had received some changes from the 2013 production, such as new changes to the score by Oliver Fox and Jason Carr, new script and scene changes including flying and fighting scenes. Many members of the cast had also changed from the previous production.

Royal Lyceum Theatre, Edinburgh (2018-19) 

A new production directed by Eleanor Rhode, starring Isobel McArthur as Wendy Darling and Ziggy Heath as Peter Pan, ran at the Lyceum Theatre, Edinburgh from 29 November 2018 to 5 January 2019.

Leeds Playhouse (2021) 

A revival was commissioned as part of the Christmas season at the Leeds Playhouse, with original director Jonathan Munby returning.

Characters and cast 

 Gale stepped in to play Wendy as original actress Fiona Button had to withdraw due to injury in rehearsals.

References 

2013 plays
Works based on Peter Pan
Plays set in England
Plays based on novels
Plays based on other plays